Mohamed Amine Najmi (born 8 May 1981), commonly known as Najmi, is a Moroccan former footballer who played as defender.

References

External links

Moroccan footballers
1981 births
Living people
People from Khouribga
Ajman Club players
Olympique Club de Khouribga players
UAE Pro League players
Association football defenders
Morocco international footballers
Moroccan expatriate footballers
Moroccan expatriate sportspeople in Kuwait
Expatriate footballers in Kuwait
RS Berkane players
Maghreb de Fès players
Al-Arabi SC (Kuwait) players
Kuwait Premier League players